Air Chief Marshal Itthaporn Subhawong (born 6 January 1952) was appointed as the 21st Commander-in-Chief of the Royal Thai Air Force (RTAF) on 1 October 2008 until 30 September 2012.

Education and careers
Itthaporn Subhawong was born on 6 January 1952 in Nakhon Ratchasima, Thailand.  He attended Saint Gabriel's College before commencing training at the Royal Thai Air Force Academy from where he was commissioned in 1975.

References

External links

Royal Thai Air Force - Air Chief Marshal Itthaporn Subhawong

|-

Living people
1952 births
Itthaporn Subhawong
Itthaporn Subhawong
Itthaporn Subhawong
Itthaporn Subhawong
Itthaporn Subhawong